ㅕ (yeo) is a diphthong of the Korean hangul alphabet, representing the sound [jʌ] as described by the IPA. 

The Unicode for ㅕ is U+3155.

Stroke order

References 

Hangul jamo
Vowel letters